Lynden Dunn (born 14 May 1987) is a retired professional Australian rules footballer who played in the Australian Football League (AFL) for Melbourne from 2005 to 2016 and for Collingwood from 2017 to 2020. He kicked 99 goals in 198 games.

Career
Dunn was selected as Melbourne's second pick and 15th overall in the 2004 AFL Draft. 2005 was a learning year for Dunn who developed well with Melbourne's VFL affiliate team, Sandringham.

The young forward made significant progress in 2006, increasing his body size, and worked hard to break into the senior lineup for his debut in round 6, a tightly fought victory over the Cats. Dunn played eleven games at senior level, kicking 13 goals and showed promising signs that he will be a player of the future for the Demons.

He worked hard on his body over the pre-season and after suffering a fractured cheekbone in the VFL, Dunn was able to return to the senior team in round 4, 2007, kicking three goals in a heavy loss to the Dockers. He played 12 games that season.

Dunn was embroiled in controversy in 2008 when he was reported twice within a minute for striking Brent Harvey - incidents for which he escaped from the tribunal with merely a reprimand.

In 2010 Dunn had switched from playing as a tagger to a defensive-forward and had kicked his most goals in a single season, including a career best five goals against Richmond at the MCG in round 19.

As of the end of the 2017 season, Dunn has played the most games of any current AFL player without playing in a final. He was traded to Collingwood during the 2016 trade period.

In August 2017, Dunn joined Collingwood's Women's coaching team as an assistant coach.

In October 2019, Dunn was delisted by Collingwood, with the club leaving the option of them considering him in the rookie draft if he is still without a club. In March 2020, Collingwood used their final list spot to sign Dunn on a one-year rookie deal.

In October 2020, Dunn retired from football, after kicking 99 goals in 198 games.

Statistics
 Statistics are correct to the end of the 2020 season

|- style="background:#eaeaea;"
! scope="row" style="text-align:center" | 2005
|
| 14 || 0 || — || — || — || — || — || — || — || — || — || — || — || — || — || — 
|-
! scope="row" style="text-align:center" | 2006
|
| 14 || 11 || 13 || 10 || 70 || 33 || 103 || 42 || 13 || 1.2 || 0.9 || 6.4 || 3 || 9.4 || 3.8 || 1.2
|-style="background:#eaeaea;"
! scope="row" style="text-align:center" | 2007
|
| 14 || 12 || 9 || 7 || 87 || 68 || 155 || 41 || 38 || 0.8 || 0.6 || 7.3 || 5.7 || 12.9 || 3.4 || 3.2
|- 
! scope="row" style="text-align:center" | 2008
|
| 14 || 16 || 6 || 6 || 101 || 89 || 190 || 59 || 53 || 0.4 || 0.4 || 6.3 || 5.6 || 11.9 || 3.7 || 3.3
|-style="background:#eaeaea;"
! scope="row" style="text-align:center" | 2009
|
| 14 || 13 || 8 || 1 || 120 || 90 || 210 || 59 || 42 || 0.6 || 0.1 || 9.2 || 6.9 || 16.2 || 4.5 || 3.2
|- 
! scope="row" style="text-align:center" | 2010
|
| 14 || 18 || 26 || 22 || 195 || 70 || 265 || 107 || 50 || 1.4 || 1.2 || 10.8 || 3.9 || 14.7 || 5.9 || 2.8
|- style="background:#eaeaea;"
! scope="row" style="text-align:center" | 2011
|
| 14 || 11 || 16 || 10 || 86 || 37 || 123 || 50 || 31 || 1.5 || 0.9 || 7.8 || 3.4 || 11.2 || 4.5 || 2.8
|- 
! scope="row" style="text-align:center" | 2012
|
| 14 || 18 || 9 || 6 || 164 || 82 || 246 || 69 || 46 || 0.5 || 0.3 || 9.1 || 4.6 || 13.7 || 3.8 || 2.6
|- style="background:#eaeaea;"
! scope="row" style="text-align:center" | 2013
|
| 14 || 18 || 4 || 2 || 195 || 93 || 288 || 67 || 59 || 0.2 || 0.1 || 10.8 || 5.2 || 16.0 || 3.7 || 3.3
|- 
! scope="row" style="text-align:center" | 2014
|
| 14 || 22 || 4 || 8 || 273 || 114 || 387 || 125 || 26 || 0.2 || 0.4 || 12.4 || 5.2 || 17.6 || 5.7 || 1.2
|- style="background:#eaeaea;"
! scope="row" style="text-align:center" | 2015
|
| 14 || 22 || 1 || 2 || 242 || 120 || 362 || 99 || 55 || 0.0 || 0.1 || 11.0 || 5.5 || 16.5 || 4.5 || 2.5
|- 
! scope="row" style="text-align:center" | 2016
|
| 14 || 4 || 1 || 0 || 42 || 13 || 55 || 15 || 10 || 0.3 || 0.0 || 10.5 || 3.3 || 13.8 || 3.8 || 2.5
|- style="background:#eaeaea;"
! scope="row" style="text-align:center" | 2017
|
| 15 || 17 || 1 || 1 || 162 || 68 || 230 || 88 || 23 || 0.1 || 0.1 || 9.5 || 4.0 || 13.5 || 5.2 || 1.4
|- 
! scope="row" style="text-align:center" | 2018
|
| 15 || 14 || 0 || 0 || 119 || 60 || 179 || 57 || 28 || 0.0 || 0.0 || 8.5 || 4.3 || 12.8 || 4.1 || 2.0
|- style="background:#eaeaea;"
! scope="row" style="text-align:center" | 2019
|
| 15 || 0 || — || — || — || — || — || — || — || — || — || — || — || — || — || — 
|- 
! scope="row" style="text-align:center" | 2020
|
| 15 || 2 || 1 || 0 || 12 || 6 || 18 || 5 || 3 || 0.5 || 0.0 || 6.0 || 3.0 || 9.0 || 2.5 || 1.5
|- class="sortbottom"
! colspan=3| Career
! 198
! 99
! 75
! 1868
! 943
! 2811
! 883
! 477
! 0.5
! 0.4
! 9.4
! 4.8
! 14.2
! 4.5
! 2.4
|}

References

External links

Demon Wiki profile

1987 births
Melbourne Football Club players
Living people
Australian rules footballers from Victoria (Australia)
Calder Cannons players
Casey Demons players
Collingwood Football Club players